Vanløse IF is a Danish football club from the Vanløse area of Copenhagen, which plays in Danish 3rd Division. The club has a rich history with former players like Preben Elkjær and Michael Laudrup and have won the Danish Cup in 1974. It currently has about 1000 members.

Honours
Danish Cup
Winners (1): 1974

Achievements
2 seasons in the Highest Danish League
23 seasons in the Second Highest Danish League
18 seasons in the Third Highest Danish League

References

External links
 Vanløse IF 
 Avarta – Vanløse on YouTube.com

 
Football clubs in Denmark
1921 establishments in Denmark
Association football clubs established in 1921
Football clubs in Copenhagen